Autologous stem-cell transplantation (also called autogenous, autogeneic, or autogenic stem-cell transplantation and abbreviated auto-SCT) is autologous transplantation of stem cells—that is, transplantation in which stem cells (undifferentiated cells from which other cell types develop) are removed from a person, stored, and later given back to that same person.

Although it is most frequently performed with hematopoietic stem cells (precursors of blood-forming cells) in hematopoietic stem cell transplantation, cardiac cells have also been used successfully to repair damage caused by heart attacks.

Autologous stem-cell transplantation is distinguished from allogenic stem cell transplantation where the donor and the recipient of the stem cells are different people.

See also
 Autologous hematopoietic stem-cell transplantation
 Stem-cell therapy

References

External links
 Autologous stem-cell transplantation entry in the public domain NCI Dictionary of Cancer Terms
 ScienceDaily Report University of Louisville. "Two years out, patients receiving stem cell therapy show sustained heart function improvement, study suggests." ScienceDaily, 6 Nov. 2012. Web. 6 Nov. 2012.

Transplantation medicine
Stem cells